The 2015 Pro Mazda Championship Winterfest was the second winter championship promoted by the series, the first being in 2014. It served as a prelude to the 2015 Pro Mazda Championship season. It consisted of five races held during two race meets, alongside the 2015 U.S. F2000 Winterfest. The previous edition included only four races, with two at each track.

Team Pelfrey's Jack Aitken and Andretti Autosport driver Weiron Tan were the main title protagonists, sharing all five victories between them. Tan amassed the most points with race results – two wins and three second places – but a five-point penalty for unsportsmanlike conduct on the podium at NOLA Motorsports Park allowed Aitken to take the championship title by one point ahead of Tan. Third place went to Tan's team-mate Dalton Kellett, who took his only podium finish in the final race at Barber Motorsports Park, which awarded double points after one of the track's scheduled three races was canceled due to bad weather.

Drivers and teams
All teams are American-registered.

Race calendar and results
The series schedule, along with the other Road to Indy series schedules, was announced on November 3, 2014.

Championship standings

Drivers' championship
 Due to the cancelation of the first race at Barber Motorsports Park, double points were awarded in the final race of the championship.

Teams' championship

References

External links
 Pro Mazda Championship Official website

Indy Pro 2000 Championship
Pro Mazda Winterfest
Pro Mazda Winterfest
Pro Mazda Winterfest